Krantiveera Sangolli Rayanna (Legendary warrior Sangolli Rayanna) is a 2012 Indian Kannada-language war film directed by Naganna and produced by Anand Appugol. Darshan, Jaya Prada and Nikita Thukral play lead roles. The film is about Sangolli Rayanna, a prominent freedom fighter from Karnataka, who fought the East India Company till he was captured and executed in 1830.

Kranti Veera Sangolli Rayanna was produced at an estimated cost of Rs 30 crore and collected approximately  30 crore in 22 days of screening in Karnataka and  40 crore in 75 days in theatres.

Plot

A respectable village head decides to keep his son away from the violent politics of rural life. However, fate intervenes, forcing the young man to not only return home, but also take up the sickle.

Cast

 Darshan as Sangolli Rayanna
 Jayapradha as Kittur Rani Chennamma
 Nikita Thukral as Mallavva
 Divya Parameshwaran
 Shashikumar as Channabasava
 Srinivasa Murthy as Veerappa Sardar
 Jai Jagadish as Venkanagouda
 Avinash as Balappa Kulkarni
 Ramesh Bhat
 Umashree as Kenchamma   
 Karibasavaiah as Pakira
 Doddanna as Venkata Rao
 Satyajith as Mallappa Shetty
 Shobhraj as Bandari baboo
 Bank Janardhan as Linganagouda 
 Saurav 
 Sadashiv Brahmavara 
 Anand Appugol as King of Shivagatti 
 Sadashiv Vinaysarathi
 Rajesh Nataranga 
 Dharma 
 Ravichetan
 Moogu Suresh

Production

Casting
Initially, Arjun Sarja was selected for the lead role which is being portrayed by Darshan. and Priyamani was named previously for the female lead role, but later she refused the offer to do such historical character. Finally, Nikita Thukral was offered the lead role. Jaya Prada portrayed the role of Kittur Chennamma. The same role was filled by B. Saroja Devi in the 1962 film Kitturu Chennamma.

Filming

The team was filmed in Jaipur (Rajasthan) with more than a thousand artists, including horses and elephants. The production team shot for 40 days in a desert village called Thula to capture the battle scene. Fake human body parts were designed by Rajasthan artists for the war scenes to make the war sequences look real.

Producer Anand Appugol explained the shooting experience to the press. Jaya Prada, who appears as Kittur Chennamma spent 30 days with the team". She said, "I have acted in nearly 700 films. But I haven’t seen a rich film like this ever shot in the south". Producer Appugol said about his favorite star, "Darshan Thoogudeep was totally involved in the character of Sangolli Rayanna while filming the scenes".

The film will be a big boost to the Kannada film industry and Darshan Thoogudeep's career as it is made with a very high budget and a good team. Film posters were nominated for the Internet Poster Design Award.
 
In the war field, 30 elephants, hundreds of horses, thousands of soldiers, 320 fighters from Bangalore, Hyderabad, and Mumbai have taken part in some risky shots. Seven cameras, including the latest photogenic 500, fitting small cameras to the horses and heli-cam were pressed into action. Shooting in Murugod cave was another rich experience. The cave to the road level was used for five days shoot for the film. Twenty-five days were spent shooting on location in Mysore.

Veteran actor Srinivasa Murthy fell down from a speeding horse at Jaipur at the shooting spot, and he was saved by Darshan.

Soundtrack

Reception

Critical response 

A critic from The Times of India scored the film at 4 out of 5 stars and says "A highlight of the movie is powerful dialogues by T Keshavadithya. Cinematography by Rameshbabu and editing by Dipu S Kumar add to the gloss of the film". B S Srivani from Deccan Herald wrote "Ultimately, Sangolli Rayanna is one man’s passion realised with equal determination by others. That passion, in this case, is easily transferred to the viewer and set the cash box ringing. Kudos Keshavaditya and team". Srikanth Srinivasa from Rediff.com scored the film at 3 out of 5 stars and wrote "Though director Naganna could have done away with at least 25 -30 minutes of footage, it still manages to keep you engaged which is quite an achievement. There are a few flaws in documenting the period. Krantiveera Sangolli Rayanna is a must-see film for all. Rarely do historical films get made and this is a rare opportunity for people of this generation to watch such a movie". Shruti I L from DNA wrote "She plays the role of his mother and in true sense it is she and the well written dialogues that bring out the patriotism in you. And what better time than this Kannada Rajyotsava week to revel in its spirit, we wonder, more so if you are like Darshan!". A critic from Bangalore Mirror wrote  "The film will definitely satisfy fans of Darshan. But it will certainly not pull in crowds that have deserted Kannada films in the recent years. It deserves to be watched by all people who are still watching Kannada films".

Awards and accolades

References

External links
 

2012 films
2010s Kannada-language films
2010s action war films
Indian epic films
Indian action war films
Historical epic films
Biographical action films
Indian biographical films
2010s historical action films
Indian historical action films
2010s biographical films
Films set in the 19th century
Films set in the Indian independence movement
Films set in ancient India
Films set in Karnataka
Films shot in Rajasthan
Films shot in Karnataka
Films directed by Naganna